Friesan Fire (foaled April 30, 2006, in Kentucky) is an American Thoroughbred racehorse. He was sired by 1992 American Horse of the Year, A.P. Indy, a son of the 1977  U.S. Triple Crown winner, Seattle Slew. His dam, Bollinger, is an Australian Group One winner and a daughter of 1993 American Champion Two-Year-Old Colt, Dehere. Bred by Grapestock LLC, he was sold for $725,000 at the Keeneland yearling sale in September 2007.

Owned and raced by Vinery Stables & Fox Hill Farm, Friesan Fire is trained by J. Larry Jones, who trained Eight Belles, the 2008 Kentucky Derby second-place finisher. The colt's best result racing as a two-year-old was a third-place finish in the 2008 Belmont Futurity Stakes. However, after winning three important Graded stakes races including the Louisiana Derby, he became a leading contender for the Kentucky Derby, the first leg of the U.S. Triple Crown series, and was the favorite on Derby Day at 7:2 after I Want Revenge scratched. He finished 18th.

On January 23, 2010, Fresian Fire, racing in blinkers, he took the Louisiana Handicap wire to wire, beating General Quarters, a horse also on the 2009 Derby trail. He was fourth in the Texas Mile Stakes in 2011.

Stud career
Friesan Fire's descendants include:

c = colt, f = filly

References

 Friesan Fire's pedigree and partial racing stats
 Friesan Fire at The Bloodhorse.com Stallion Register online

2006 racehorse births
Thoroughbred family 2-c
Racehorses bred in Kentucky
Racehorses trained in the United States